John Charles Njie (Arabic: جون تشارلز نجي), is a Gambian actor.

Career
In 2011, he made debut cinema acting with the film The Mirror Boy. The film was released through Netflix. In 2013, he was nominated to the Best Actor for the Nollywood and Africa People's Choice Awards at Africa Movie Academy Awards for the film Hand of fate.

Filmography

References

External links

Living people
Year of birth missing (living people)
Gambian actors